This Love may refer to:

 This Love (album), a 2006 album by Khalil Fong

Songs 
 "This Love" (Angela Aki song), 2006
 "This Love" (Bad Company song), 1986
 "This Love" (Craig Armstrong song), 1998
 "This Love" (LeAnn Rimes song), 2004
 "This Love" (Maroon 5 song), 2004
 "This Love" (Pantera song), 1992
 "This Love" (Taylor Swift song), 2014
 "This Love" (The Veronicas song), 2008
 "This Love", by Big Bang, from the album Big Bang
 "This Love", by Camila Cabello, from the album Romance (2019)
 "This Love", by Daniel Ash, from the album Coming Down
 "This Love", by Golden Earring, from the album Tits 'n Ass
 "This Love", by Lou Rhodes, from the album Bloom
 "This Love", by The Magic Numbers, from their eponymous album
 "This Love", by Meghan Trainor, from the album Only 17
 "This Love", by Mary Mary, from the album Incredible
 "This Love", by Shinhwa, from the album The Classic
"This Love", covered by Ryan Adams, from the album 1989
 "This Love (Will Be Your Downfall)", a song by Ellie Goulding, from her debut album, Lights

See also 
 Kill This Love, a 2019 EP by Blackpink